Josu Ortuondo Larrea (born 13 February 1948 in Bilbao)
is a Spanish politician and
Member of the European Parliament with the Basque Nationalist Party,
Member of the Bureau of the Alliance of Liberals and Democrats for Europe and sits on
the European Parliament's Committee on Transport and Tourism.

He is a substitute for the Committee on Fisheries
and the Committee on Industry, Research and Energy. He is also a member of the
Delegation for relations with the countries of Central America.

Education
 1975: Graduate in business studies
 M.A
 1982: in business administration

Career
 1969–1987: Banking executive
 1993–1999: President of Bilbogás
 2000 1993–1999: President of Bilbao Ria
 1995–1999: Member of the executive committee and board of directors of Caja de Ahorros (bank)
 1991–1999: President of the Bilbao International Fair
 1979–1981: Member of the EAJ-PNV Regional Executive Committee
 1983–1987: Member of the National Executive Committee, responsible for administration and finances
 1991–1999: Mayor and Chairman of the Municipal Council of Bilbao
 1995–1999: President of the Council of Basque Municipalities
 1987–1991: Director-General of the Public Basque Radio and Television Corporation (EITB)
 1994–1999: Member of the executive committee of the Council of European Municipalities and Regions
 1995–1999: Member of the executive committee of 'Eurocities'
 1998–1999: President of 'Eurocities'
 since 1999: Member of the European Parliament

See also
 2004 European Parliament election in Spain

External links
 
 

1948 births
Living people
Basque Nationalist Party MEPs
MEPs for Spain 1999–2004
MEPs for Spain 2004–2009
Mayors of Bilbao
Politicians from Bilbao
Spanish bankers